William "Bill" Abbott Jr. (born 21 May 1954) is a Canadian sailor. He competed in the 1996 and 2000 Summer Olympics.
In 2021 Abbott was elected vice-chair of the World Sailing Equipment Rules Sub-committee.

References

1954 births
Living people
Canadian male sailors (sport)
North American Champions Soling
Olympic sailors of Canada
Sailors at the 1996 Summer Olympics – Soling
Sailors at the 2000 Summer Olympics – Soling
Sportspeople from Sarnia
Soling class world champions
World Sailing officials